Undertale Soundtrack (stylized as UNDERTALE Soundtrack) is a soundtrack album by Toby Fox, released in 2015 for the video game Undertale.

Development
The game's soundtrack was entirely composed by Fox with FL Studio. A self-taught musician, he composed most of the tracks with little iteration; the game's main theme, "Undertale", was the only song to undergo multiple iterations in development. The soundtrack was inspired by music from Super NES role-playing games—such as EarthBound and Live A Live—bullet hell series Touhou Project, the chiptune band Anamanaguchi, as well as the webcomic Homestuck, for which Fox provided some of the music. Fox also stated that he tries to be inspired by all music he listens to, particularly those in video games. According to Fox, over 90% of the songs were composed specifically for the game. "Megalovania" (stylized as "MEGALOVANIA"), the song used during the boss battle against Sans, had previously been used within Homestuck and in one of Fox's EarthBound ROM hacks. For each section of the game, Fox composed the music prior to programming, as it helped "decide how the scene should go". He initially tried using a music tracker to compose the soundtrack, but found it difficult to use. He ultimately decided to play segments of the music separately, and connect them on a track. To celebrate the first anniversary of the game, Fox released five unused musical works on his blog in 2016. Four of the game's songs were released as official downloadable content for the Steam version of Taito's Groove Coaster.

Release and reception

Undertale official soundtrack was released by video game music label Materia Collective in 2015, simultaneously with the game's release. Additionally, two official Undertale cover albums have been released: the 2015 metal/electronic album Determination by RichaadEB and Ace Waters, and the 2016 jazz album Live at Grillby by Carlos Eiene, better known as insaneintherainmusic. Another album of jazz duets based on Undertales songs, Prescription for Sleep, was performed and released in 2016 by saxophonist Norihiko Hibino and pianist Ayaki Sato. A 2×LP vinyl edition of the Undertale soundtrack, produced by iam8bit, was also released in the same year. Two official Undertale Piano Collections sheet music books and digital albums, arranged by David Peacock and performed by Augustine Mayuga Gonzales, were released in 2017 and 2018 by Materia Collective. A Mii Fighter costume based on Sans was made available for download in the crossover title Super Smash Bros. Ultimate in September 2019, marking the character's official debut as a 3D model. This costume also adds a new arrangement of "Megalovania" by Fox as a music track. Super Smash Bros. director Masahiro Sakurai noted that Sans was a popular request to appear in the game. Music from Undertale was also added to Taiko no Tatsujin: Drum 'n' Fun! as downloadable content.

Undertale soundtrack has been well received by critics as part of the success of the game, in particular for its use of various leitmotifs for the various characters used throughout various tracks. In particular, "Hopes and Dreams", the boss theme when fighting Asriel in the run-through where the player avoids killing any monster, brings back most of the main character themes, and is "a perfect way to cap off your journey", according to USgamer's Nadia Oxford. Oxford notes this track in particular demonstrates Fox's ability at "turning old songs into completely new experiences", used throughout the game's soundtrack. Tyler Hicks of GameSpot compared the music to "bit-based melodies".

The Undertale soundtrack had frequently been covered by various styles and groups. As part of the fifth anniversary of the game, Fox streamed footage with permission of a 2019 concert of the Undertale songs performed by Music Engine, an orchestra group in Japan, with support of Fangamer and 8–4.

The track "Megalovania" has seen extensive use in Internet memes. In January 2022, the song was played in a circus performance happening during a weekly public audience with Pope Francis.

Track listing

Charts

References

Further reading

External links
 

Undertale
2015 soundtrack albums
Video game soundtracks
Internet memes introduced in 2015